Dwight Junior Hardy (born December 2, 1986) is an American professional basketball player, who lastly played for OGM Ormanspor of the Basketball Super League.

He also holds a Congolese passport.

College career
St. John's head coach Steve Lavin praised Hardy, calling him one of the best shooters he has ever coached. In March 2011, Hardy was one of the 20 finalists selected for the coveted Wooden Award.

Professional career
After a successful first season in Italy, averaging 22 points, 3 rebounds, and 2 assists per game for Pistoia Basket, and receiving Italian 2nd Division MVP honors, Hardy signed with Sidigas Avellino in the Italian 1st Division. In January 2013, he parted ways with them. In March 2013, he signed with the Italian 2nd Division club Sigma Barcellona for the remainder of the season.

On June 22, 2013, Hardy signed with the Italian 1st Division club Virtus Bologna. In June 2014, he signed with Trabzonspor Basketball of the Turkish League for the 2014–15 season.

On July 16, 2020, he has signed with OGM Ormanspor of the Basketball Super League.

References

External links
 Eurobasket.com Profile
 Italian League Profile 
 St. John's Red Storm bio
 
TBLStat.net Profile

1986 births
American expatriate basketball people in Italy
American expatriate basketball people in Turkey
American men's basketball players
American people of Republic of the Congo descent
Bahçeşehir Koleji S.K. players
Basketball players from New York City
Galatasaray S.K. (men's basketball) players
Indian Hills Warriors basketball players
Limoges CSP players
Living people
OGM Ormanspor players
Pistoia Basket 2000 players
Point guards
S.S. Felice Scandone players
Shooting guards
Sportspeople from the Bronx
St. John's Red Storm men's basketball players
Trabzonspor B.K. players
Virtus Bologna players